Kard is an abandoned village in the Kajaran Municipality of Syunik Province, Armenia. The Statistical Committee of Armenia reported it was uninhabited at the 2001 and 2011 censuses.

References 

Former populated places in Syunik Province